The men's 10,000 meter at the 2022 KNSB Dutch Single Distance Championships took place in Heerenveen at the Thialf ice skating rink on Sunday 31 October 2021. There were 12 participants. Although the tournament was held in 2021 it was the 2022 edition as it was part of the 2021–2022 speed skating season.

Statistics

Result

Draw

Referee: Berri Timmerman.  Assistant: Wil Schildwacht.  Starter: André de Vries 
Start: 12:15.00 hr. Finish: 1:59.09 hr. 

Source:

References

Single Distance Championships
2022 Single Distance